Records for the Canberra Raiders have been maintained since their inception in 1982.

Team records

Biggest wins

Biggest losses

Most consecutive wins
11, 30 July 1989 – 25 March 1990
11, 18 September 1994 – 7 May 1995

Most consecutive losses
8, 28 July 1985 – 23 March 1986
8, 18 March 2011 – 14 May 2011

Biggest comeback
Trailed 22-0 against Wests Tigers to win 30-22 at Leichhardt Oval (19-4-2015).
Trailed 22-0 against Newcastle Knights to win 29-25 at GIO Stadium (03-07-2016).
Trailed 22-0 against Gold Coast Titans to win 24-22 at GIO Stadium (03-26-2022).

Attendances
 Seiffert Oval: 18,272 vs Brisbane Broncos, 18 June 1989
 GIO Stadium: 26,567 vs South Sydney Rabbitohs, 27 September 2019
 NRL Grand Final – 82,922 vs Sydney Roosters, 6 October 2019 at ANZ Stadium
 World Club Challenge – 30,786 vs Widnes, 4 October 1989 at Old Trafford

Canberra Raiders win–loss records

Active teams

Discontinued teams

Individual records

Most first-grade games
318, Jason Croker (1991–2006)
292, Jarrod Croker (2009–)
244, Laurie Daley (1987–2000)
234, Simon Woolford (1994–2006)
228, Steve Walters (1986–1996)
224, Ruben Wiki (1993–2004)
220, Alan Tongue (2000–2011)
220, Jack Wighton (2012–)
203, Ricky Stuart (1988–1998)
202, Chris O'Sullivan (1982–1990, 1992)

Most tries in a match
5 - Mal Meninga against Eastern Suburbs Roosters at Bruce Stadium (15 April 1990)

Most goals in a match
10, David Furner against Parramatta Eels at Bruce Stadium (22 August 1993)
10, Terry Campese against Penrith Panthers at Bruce Stadium (10 August 2008)

Most points in a match
38, (5 tries, 9 goals), Mal Meninga against Easts at Bruce Stadium (15 April 1990)
36, (4 tries, 10 goals), Terry Campese against Penrith Panthers at Canberra Stadium (10 August 2008)

Most tries in a season
23, Jordan Rapana in 2016
22, Noa Nadruku in 1993
22, Jason Croker in 1994
22, Brett Mullins in 1994
21, Noa Nadruku in 1996
21, Joel Monaghan in 2003
20, John Ferguson in 1988

Most tries for club
133, Jarrod Croker (2009–)
120, Jason Croker (1991–2006)
105, Brett Mullins (1990–2000)
89, Jordan Rapana (2014–)
87, Laurie Daley (1987–2000)
74, Mal Meninga (1986–1994)
73, Noa Nadruku (1993–1997)
69, Gary Belcher (1986–1993)
69, Joel Monaghan (2001–2004, 2008–2010)
68, Phil Graham (2002–2009)
68, Jack Wighton (2012–)

Most points in a season
296 (18 tries, 112 goals), Jarrod Croker in 2016
245 (10 tries, 102 goals, 1 field goal), Clinton Schifcofske in 2001
236 (12 tries, 94 goals), Jarrod Croker in 2015
228 (13 tries, 88 goals), Jarrod Croker in 2019
226 (16 tries, 81, goals), Jarrod Croker in 2012
222 (8 tries, 94 goals, 2 field goals), Clinton Schifcofske in 2003
218 (10 tries, 89 goals) Gary Belcher in 1988
212 (17 tries, 72 goals) Mal Meninga in 1990
202 (18 tries, 65 goals), Jarrod Croker in 2014
198 (10 tries, 79 goals) David Furner in 1995
196 (6 tries, 86 goals) David Furner in 1994 
193 (5 tries, 86 goals, 1 field goal), Ron Giteau in 1983

Most points for club
2,244 (133 tries, 856 goals), Jarrod Croker (2009–)
1,218 (49 tries, 511 goals), David Furner (1992–2000)
1,052 (44 tries, 432 goals, 12 field goals), Clinton Schifcofske (2001–2006)
864 (74 tries, 283 goals, 2 field goals), Mal Meninga (1986–1994)
572 (69 tries, 148 goals), Gary Belcher (1986–1993)
527 (14 tries, 234 goals, 3 field goals), Ron Giteau (1983–1986)

Updated May 6, 2022

Individual competition honours

Clive Churchill Medal
Awarded to NRL Grand Final Player of the Match
1989 – Bradley Clyde
1990 – Ricky Stuart
1991 – Bradley Clyde
1994 – David Furner
2019 – Jack Wighton

Dally M Medal
Awarded to NRL Season Player of the Year
1993 – Ricky Stuart
1995 – Laurie Daley
2020 – Jack Wighton

Golden Boot Award 
Awarded to World's Best Rugby League Player of the Year
1989 – Mal Meninga

Jack Gibson Medal
Awarded to National Youth Competition Grand Final Player of the Match
2008 - Josh Dugan

Preston Campbell Medal
Awarded to the All Star Player of the Match
2011- Josh Dugan
2022- Joseph Tapine

Mal Meninga Medal
Awarded to Canberra Raiders NRL Player of the Season.

 
Players who have received the medal more than once:
Laurie Daley  = 6
Josh Papalii = 4
Ricky Stuart  = 3
Chris O'Sullivan  = 2
Gary Belcher  = 2
Ruben Wiki  = 2
Clinton Schifcofske = 2
Josh Miller = 2
Shaun Fensom = 2

Season summaries

See also

List of NRL records

References

External links

Records
National Rugby League lists
Canberra-related lists
Australian records
Rugby league records and statistics